Northwestern University is a private research university in Evanston, Illinois. Founded in 1851,  Northwestern is the oldest chartered university in Illinois and is ranked among the top academic institutions in the United States and world.  

Chartered by the Illinois General Assembly in 1851, Northwestern was established to serve the former Northwest Territory, and was initially affiliated with the Methodist Episcopal Church but later became non-sectarian. By 1900, the university was the third largest university in the United States. Northwestern became a founding member of the Big Ten Conference in 1896 and joined the Association of American Universities as an early member in 1917. 

The university is composed of eleven undergraduate, graduate, and professional schools, which include the Kellogg School of Management, the Pritzker School of Law, the Feinberg School of Medicine, the Weinberg College of Arts and Sciences, the Bienen School of Music, the McCormick School of Engineering and Applied Science, the Medill School of Journalism, the School of Communication, the School of Professional Studies, the School of Education and Social Policy, and The Graduate School. Northwestern's campus lies along the shores of Lake Michigan in Evanston. The university's law, medical, and professional schools, along with Northwestern Memorial Hospital, are located in Chicago's Streeterville neighborhood, while journalism graduate programs are located on the New Eastside. The university also maintains a campus in Education City, Qatar and academic centers in Miami, San Francisco, and Washington, D.C.

Northwestern has an endowment of $15.4 billion, one of the largest university endowments in the world, as well as an annual budget of around $2.5 billion. As of Fall 2021, the university had 23,410 enrolled students, including 8,817 undergraduates and 14,593 graduate students. Fielding eight men's and eleven women's sports teams, the Northwestern Wildcats represent the university in the NCAA Division I Big Ten Conference and has remained the only private university in the conference since 1946.

Past and present Northwestern faculty and alumni have included numerous heads of state, 2 Fields Medalists, 23 Nobel Prize laureates, 43 Pulitzer Prize winners, 23 MacArthur Fellows, 28 Marshall Scholars, 94 members of the American Academy of Arts and Sciences, 19 Rhodes Scholars, 10 living billionaires, and 24 Olympic medalists.

History

Founding and early years 
The foundation of Northwestern University can be traced to a meeting on May 31, 1850, of nine prominent Chicago businessmen, Methodist leaders, and attorneys who had formed the idea of establishing a university to serve what had been known from 1787 to 1803 as the Northwest Territory. On January 28, 1851, the Illinois General Assembly granted a charter to the Trustees of the North-Western University, making it the first chartered university in Illinois. The school's nine founders, all of whom were Methodists (three of them ministers), knelt in prayer and worship before launching their first organizational meeting. Although they affiliated the university with the Methodist Episcopal Church, they favored a non-sectarian admissions policy, believing that Northwestern should serve all people in the newly developing territory by bettering the economy in Evanston.

John Evans, for whom Evanston is named, bought  of land along Lake Michigan in 1853, and Philo Judson developed plans for what would become the city of Evanston, Illinois. The first building, Old College, opened on November 5, 1855. To raise funds for its construction, Northwestern sold $100 "perpetual scholarships" entitling the purchaser and his heirs to free tuition. Another building, University Hall, was built in 1869 of the same Joliet limestone as the Chicago Water Tower, also built in 1869, one of the few buildings in the heart of Chicago to survive the Great Chicago Fire of 1871.

In 1873 the Evanston College for Ladies merged with Northwestern, and Frances Willard, who later gained fame as a suffragette and as one of the founders of the Woman's Christian Temperance Union (WCTU), became the school's first dean of women (Willard Residential College, built in 1938, honors her name). Northwestern admitted its first female students in 1869, and the first woman graduated in 1874. Northwestern fielded its first intercollegiate football team in 1882, later becoming a founding member of the Big Ten Conference. In the 1870s and 1880s, Northwestern affiliated itself with already existing schools of law, medicine, and dentistry in Chicago. Northwestern University Pritzker School of Law is the oldest law school in Chicago. As the university's enrollments grew, these professional schools were integrated with the undergraduate college in Evanston; the result was a modern research university combining professional, graduate, and undergraduate programs, which gave equal weight to teaching and research.

20th century 
By the turn of the century, Northwestern had grown in stature to become the third largest university in the United States after Harvard University and the University of Michigan. Under Walter Dill Scott's presidency from 1920 to 1939, Northwestern began construction of an integrated campus in Chicago designed by James Gamble Rogers, noted for his design of the Yale University campus, to house the professional schools. The university also established the Kellogg School of Management and built several prominent buildings on the Evanston campus, including Dyche Stadium, now named Ryan Field, and Deering Library among others. In the 1920s, Northwestern became one of the first six universities in the United States to establish a Naval Reserve Officers Training Corps (NROTC). In 1939, Northwestern hosted the first-ever NCAA Men's Division I Basketball Championship game in the original Patten Gymnasium, which was later demolished and relocated farther north, along with the Dearborn Observatory, to make room for the Technological Institute.

After the golden years of the 1920s, the Great Depression in the United States (1929–1941) had a severe impact on the university's finances. Its annual income dropped 25 percent from $4.8 million in 1930–31 to $3.6 million in 1933–34. Investment income shrank, fewer people could pay full tuition, and annual giving from alumni and philanthropists fell from $870,000 in 1932 to a low of $331,000 in 1935. The university responded with two salary cuts of 10 percent each for all employees. It imposed hiring and building freezes and slashed appropriations for maintenance, books, and research. Having had a balanced budget in 1930–31, the university now faced deficits of roughly $100,000 for the next four years. Enrollments fell in most schools, with law and music suffering the biggest declines. However, the movement toward state certification of school teachers prompted Northwestern to start a new graduate program in education, thereby bringing in new students and much-needed income. In June 1933, Robert Maynard Hutchins, president of the University of Chicago, proposed a merger of the two universities, estimating annual savings of $1.7 million. The two presidents were enthusiastic, and the faculty liked the idea; many Northwestern alumni, however, opposed it, fearing the loss of their Alma Mater and its many traditions that distinguished Northwestern from Chicago. The medical school, for example, was oriented toward training practitioners, and alumni feared it would lose its mission if it were merged into the more research-oriented University of Chicago Medical School.  The merger plan was ultimately dropped. In 1935, the Deering family rescued the university budget with an unrestricted gift of $6 million, bringing the budget up to $5.4 million in 1938–39. This allowed many of the previous spending cuts to be restored, including half of the salary reductions.

Like other American research universities, Northwestern was transformed by World War II (1939–1945). Regular enrollment fell dramatically, but the school opened high-intensity, short-term programs that trained over 50,000 military personnel, including future president John F. Kennedy. Northwestern's existing NROTC program proved to be a boon to the university as it trained over 36,000 sailors over the course of the war, leading Northwestern to be called the "Annapolis of the Midwest." Franklyn B. Snyder led the university from 1939 to 1949, and after the war, surging enrollments under the G.I. Bill drove the dramatic expansion of both campuses. In 1948, prominent anthropologist Melville J. Herskovits founded the Program of African Studies at Northwestern, the first center of its kind at an American academic institution. J. Roscoe Miller's tenure as president from 1949 to 1970 saw an expansion of the Evanston campus, with the construction of the Lakefill on Lake Michigan, growth of the faculty and new academic programs, and polarizing Vietnam-era student protests. In 1978, the first and second Unabomber attacks occurred at Northwestern University. Relations between Evanston and Northwestern became strained throughout much of the post-war era because of episodes of disruptive student activism, disputes over municipal zoning, building codes, and law enforcement, as well as restrictions on the sale of alcohol near campus until 1972. Northwestern's exemption from state and municipal property-tax obligations under its original charter has historically been a source of town-and-gown tension.

Although government support for universities declined in the 1970s and 1980s, President Arnold R. Weber was able to stabilize university finances, leading to a revitalization of its campuses. In 1996, Princess Diana visited Northwestern's Evanston and Chicago campuses to raise money for the university hospital's Robert H. Lurie Comprehensive Cancer Center at the invitation of then President Bienen. Her visit raised a total of $1.5 million for cancer research.

21st century 
As admissions to colleges and universities grew increasingly competitive in the 1990s and 2000s, President Henry S. Bienen's tenure saw a notable increase in the number and quality of undergraduate applicants, continued expansion of the facilities and faculty, and renewed athletic competitiveness. In 1999, Northwestern student journalists uncovered information exonerating Illinois death-row inmate Anthony Porter two days before his scheduled execution. The Innocence Project has since exonerated 10 more men. On January 11, 2003, in a speech at Northwestern School of Law's Lincoln Hall, then Governor of Illinois George Ryan announced that he would commute the sentences of more than 150 death-row inmates.

In the 2010s, a 5-year capital campaign resulted in a new music center, a replacement building for the business school, and a $270 million athletic complex. In 2014, President Barack Obama delivered a seminal economics speech at the Evanston campus. In 2015, Queen Máxima and King Willem-Alexander of the Netherlands visited Northwestern to announce research collaborations between Northwestern and several Dutch institutions focused on the study of aging. In late 2021, an additional $480 million was donated to Northwestern by the Ryan Family to be applied to research at the Kellogg School of Management and Feinberg School of Medicine, as well as for renovating Ryan Field.

Campuses

Evanston

Northwestern's Evanston campus, where the undergraduate schools, the Graduate School, and the Kellogg School of Management are located, runs north–south from Lincoln Avenue to Clark Street west of Lake Michigan along Sheridan Road. North Campus is home to the fraternity quads, athletics facilities including the Henry Crown Sports Pavilion and Norris Aquatics Center, the Technological Institute, Dearborn Observatory, the Patrick G. and Shirley W. Ryan Hall for Nanofabrication and Molecular Self-Assembly, and the Ford Motor Company Engineering Design Center among others. South Campus is home to the university's humanities buildings, music buildings like the Pick-Staiger Concert Hall, the Mary and Leigh Block Museum of Art, and the sorority quads. In the 1960s, the university created an additional  for the campus by filling in a portion of Lake Michigan. Buildings located on the resulting Lakefill include University Library, the Patrick G. and Shirley W. Ryan Center for the Musical Arts, the Regenstein Hall of Music, Norris University Center (the student union), the Kellogg School of Management Global Hub, and various athletics facilities.

The Chicago Transit Authority's elevated train running through Evanston is called the Purple Line, taking its name from Northwestern's school color. The Foster and Davis stations are within walking distance of the southern end of the campus, while the Noyes station is close to the northern end of the campus. The Central station is close to Ryan Field, Northwestern's football stadium. The Evanston Davis Street Metra station serves the Northwestern campus in downtown Evanston and the Evanston Central Street Metra station is near Ryan Field. Pace Suburban Bus Service and the CTA have several bus routes that run through or near the Evanston campus.

Chicago

Northwestern's Chicago campus is located in the city's Streeterville neighborhood near Lake Michigan. The Chicago campus is home to the nationally ranked Northwestern Memorial Hospital, the medical school, the law school, the part-time MBA program, and the School of Professional Studies. Medill's one-year graduate program rents a floor on Wacker Drive, across the river from Streeterville and separate from the rest of the campus. Northwestern's professional schools and a number of its affiliated hospitals are located approximately four blocks east of the Chicago station on the CTA Red Line. The Chicago campus is also served by CTA bus routes.

Founded at varying points in the university's history, the professional schools originally were scattered throughout Chicago. In connection with a 1917 master plan for a central Chicago campus and President Walter Dill Scott's capital campaign,  of land were purchased at the corner of Chicago Avenue and Lake Shore Drive for $1.5 million in 1920. Architect James Gamble Rogers was commissioned to create a master plan for the principal buildings on the new campus, which he designed in collegiate gothic style. In 1923, Mrs. Montgomery Ward donated $8 million to the campaign to finance the construction of the Montgomery Ward Memorial Building, which would house the medical and dental schools, and create endowments for faculty chairs, research grants, scholarships, and building maintenance. The building would become the first university skyscraper in the United States. In addition to the Ward Building, Rogers designed Wieboldt Hall to house facilities for the School of Commerce and Levy Mayer Hall to house the School of Law. The new campus comprising these three new buildings was dedicated during a two-day ceremony in June 1927. The Chicago campus continued to expand with the addition of Thorne Hall in 1931 and Abbott Hall in 1939. In October 2013, Northwestern began the demolition of the architecturally significant Prentice Women's Hospital. Eric G. Neilson, dean of the medical school, penned an op-ed that equated retaining the building with loss of life.

Education City
In Fall 2008, Northwestern opened a campus in Education City, Doha, Qatar, joining five other American universities: Carnegie Mellon University, Cornell University, Georgetown University, Texas A&M University, and Virginia Commonwealth University. Through the Medill School of Journalism and School of Communication, NU-Q offers bachelor's degrees in journalism and communications respectively. However, some have questioned whether NU-Q can truly offer a comparable journalism program to that of its U.S. campus given Qatar's instances of censorship and strict limits on journalistic and academic freedoms. The Qatar Foundation for Education, Science and Community Development, a private charitable institution founded by former emir Sheikh Hamad bin Khalifa Al Thani and his wife and mother of the current emir Sheikha Moza bint Nasser, provided funding for construction and administrative costs, as well as support to hire 50 to 60 faculty and staff, some of whom rotate between the Evanston and Qatar campuses. Northwestern receives roughly $45 million per year to operate the campus. In February 2016, Northwestern reached an agreement with the Qatar Foundation to extend the operations of the NU-Q branch for an additional decade, through the 2027–2028 academic year. Like other universities with campuses in Doha, Northwestern has received criticism for accepting money from a country with a poor human rights record.

Organization and administration

Governance 
Northwestern is privately owned and governed by an appointed Board of Trustees, which is composed of 70 members and, is chaired by Peter Barris '74.  The board delegates its power to an elected president who serves as the chief executive officer of the university. Northwestern has had seventeen presidents in its history (excluding interim presidents). The current president, legal scholar Michael H. Schill, succeeded Morton O. Schapiro in fall 2022.The president maintains a staff of vice presidents, directors, and other assistants for administrative, financial, faculty, and student matters. Kathleen Haggerty assumed the role of provost for the university on September 1, 2020.

Students are formally involved in the university's administration through the Associated Student Government, elected representatives of the undergraduate students, and the Graduate Student Association, which represents the university's graduate students.

The admission requirements, degree requirements, courses of study, and disciplinary and degree recommendations for each of Northwestern's 12 schools are determined by the voting members of that school's faculty (assistant professor and above).

The graduate Medill School shares no connection to the rest of the Chicago campus, though it is also based downtown.
Northwestern University had a dental school from 1891 to May 31, 2001, when it closed.

Endowment 
Northwestern maintains an endowment of $16.1 billion, one of the largest university endowments in the world. The endowment is sustained through continued donations and is maintained by investment advisers at the university's Investment Office.

In 2003, Northwestern finished a five-year capital campaign that raised $1.55 billion, exceeding its fundraising goal by $550 million. In 2014, Northwestern launched the "We Will" campaign with a fundraising goal of $3.75 billion. As of December 31, 2019, the university has received $4.78 billion from 164,026 donors.

Sustainability 
In January 2009, the Green Power Partnership (sponsored by the EPA) listed Northwestern as one of the top 10 universities in the country in purchasing energy from renewable sources. The university matches 74 million kilowatt hours (kWh) of its annual energy use with Green-e Certified Renewable Energy Certificates (RECs). This green power commitment represents 30 percent of the university's total annual electricity use and places Northwestern in the EPA's Green Power Leadership Club. The Initiative for Sustainability and Energy at Northwestern (ISEN), supporting research, teaching, and outreach in these themes, was launched in 2008.

Northwestern requires that all new buildings be LEED-certified. Silverman Hall on the Evanston campus was awarded Gold LEED Certification in 2010; Wieboldt Hall on the Chicago campus was awarded Gold LEED Certification in 2007, and the Ford Motor Company Engineering Design Center on the Evanston campus was awarded Silver LEED Certification in 2006. New construction and renovation projects will be designed to provide at least a 20% improvement over energy code requirements where feasible. At the beginning of the 2008–09 academic year, the university also released the Evanston Campus Framework Plan, which outlines plans for future development of the university's Evanston campus. The plan not only emphasizes sustainable building construction but also focuses on reducing the energy costs of transportation by optimizing pedestrian and bicycle access. Northwestern has had a comprehensive recycling program in place since 1990. The university recycles over 1,500 tons of waste, or 30% of all waste produced on campus, each year. All landscape waste at the university is composted.

Academics

Admissions 

Northwestern is among the most selective universities in the United States, and admissions are characterized as "most selective" by U.S. News & World Report. Northwestern received a total of 47,633 applications for the Class of 2025 and admitted 3,239 students for an acceptance rate of 6.8%. For the Class of 2023, the interquartile range (middle 50%) on the post-2016 SAT was a combined (verbal and math) 1450-1550 out of 1600. ACT composite scores for the middle 50% ranged from 33 to 35 out of 36, and 92% ranked in the top ten percent of their respective high school classes.

In April 2016, Northwestern became one of 15 Illinois universities to sign on to the Chicago Star Partnership, a City Colleges initiative aimed at increasing opportunities for students in the city's public school district. Through this partnership, the university provides scholarships to students who "graduate from Chicago Public Schools, get their associate degree from one of the city's community colleges, and then get admitted to a bachelor's degree program."

Despite having one of the lowest acceptance rates in the United States, Northwestern, among other prestigious colleges such as Vanderbilt, has come under scrutiny for "artificial deflation" of their acceptance rate, with more than 50% of the class being accepted in the binding Early Decision round.

Education and rankings 

Northwestern is a large, residential research university, and is frequently ranked among the top universities in the United States, based on criteria such as campus diversity, social mobility of graduates, the likelihood of paying off student loans, alumni giving rates, research spending, the number of articles published in journals of Nature and Science, and data within the Integrated Postsecondary Education Data System and College Scorecard—two federal government databases, among many others.

. The university is a leading institution in the fields of materials engineering, chemistry, business, economics, education, journalism, and communications. It is also prominent in law and medicine. Accredited by the Higher Learning Commission and the respective national professional organizations for chemistry, psychology, business, education, journalism, music, engineering, law, and medicine, the university offers 124 undergraduate programs and 145 graduate and professional programs. Northwestern conferred 2,190 bachelor's degrees, 3,272 master's degrees, 565 doctoral degrees, and 444 professional degrees in 2012–2013. Since 1951, Northwestern has awarded 520 honorary degrees. Northwestern also has chapters of academic honor societies such as Phi Beta Kappa (Alpha of Illinois), Eta Kappa Nu, Tau Beta Pi, Eta Sigma Phi (Beta Chapter), Lambda Pi Eta, and Alpha Sigma Lambda (Alpha Chapter).

Northwestern is known for its focus on interdisciplinary education, extensive research output, and collaborative student culture. The university provides instruction in over 200 formal academic concentrations, including various dual degree programs. The four-year, full-time undergraduate program comprises the majority of enrollments at the university. Although there is no university-wide core curriculum, a foundation in the liberal arts and sciences are required for all majors; individual degree requirements are set by the faculty of each school. The university heavily emphasizes interdisciplinary learning, with 72% of undergrads combining two or more areas of study. Northwestern's full-time undergraduate and graduate programs operate on an approximately 10-week academic quarter system with the academic year beginning in late September and ending in early June. Under the regular academic calendar, each quarter contains a four-day Reading Period in between the end of classes and the beginning of finals. Undergraduates typically take four courses each quarter and twelve courses in an academic year and are required to complete at least twelve quarters on campus to graduate. Northwestern offers honors, accelerated, and joint degree programs in medicine, science, mathematics, engineering, and journalism. The comprehensive doctoral graduate program has high coexistence with undergraduate programs.

Despite being a mid-sized university, Northwestern maintains a relatively low student-to-faculty ratio of 6:1.

Research 

Northwestern was elected to the Association of American Universities in 1917 and is classified as an R1 university, denoting "very high" research activity. Northwestern's schools of management, engineering, and communication are among the most academically productive in the nation. The university received $887.3 million in research funding in 2019 and houses over 90 school-based and 40 university-wide research institutes and centers. Northwestern also supports nearly 1,500 research laboratories across two campuses, predominantly in the medical and biological sciences.

Northwestern is home to the Center for Interdisciplinary Exploration and Research in Astrophysics, Northwestern Institute for Complex Systems, Nanoscale Science and Engineering Center, Materials Research Center, Center for Quantum Devices, Institute for Policy Research, International Institute for Nanotechnology, Center for Catalysis and Surface Science, Buffet Center for International and Comparative Studies, the Initiative for Sustainability and Energy at Northwestern, and the Argonne/Northwestern Solar Energy Research Center among other centers for interdisciplinary research. 

The university also shares collaborative research efforts with other universities such as the CZ Biohub Chicago with the University of Chicago and University of Illinois.

Innovations and entrepreneurship 
In 2013 alone, Northwestern researchers disclosed 247 inventions, filed 270 patent applications, received 81 foreign and US patents, started 12 companies, and generated $79.8 million in licensing revenue. The Innovation and New Ventures Office (INVO) has been involved in creating the Center for Developmental Therapeutics (CDT) and the Center for Device Development (CD2).

Northwestern files hundreds of patents each year, ranking among the top 20 universities in the world in terms of U.S. utility patents. One of the university's most successful current patents is pregabalin, a synthesized organic molecule developed at the university by chemistry professor Richard Bruce Silverman (for whom Silverman Hall was named). It was ultimately marketed as Lyrica, a drug sold by Pfizer, to combat epilepsy, neuropathic pain, and fibromyalgia.

Northwestern has an extensive history of producing prominent businessmen and entrepreneurs. Notable companies founded by Northwestern alumni include Groupon, The Blackstone Group, Booz Allen Hamilton, U.S. Steel, Kirkland & Ellis, Guggenheim Partners, Accenture, Aon Corporation, and AQR Capital.

The university also runs The Garage, and interdisciplinary innovation and entrepreneurship space and community for student-run startups.

Libraries and museums 

The Northwestern library system consists of four libraries on the Evanston campus including the present main library, University Library, and the original library building, Deering Library; three libraries on the Chicago campus; and the library affiliated with Garrett-Evangelical Theological Seminary. The University Library contains over 4.9 million volumes, 4.6 million microforms, and almost 99,000 periodicals. The University Library is the 22nd-largest university library in North America based on total number of titles held.

Notable collections in the library system include the Melville J. Herskovits Library of African Studies, the largest Africana collection in the world, an extensive collection of early edition printed music and manuscripts as well as late-modern works, and an art collection noted for its 19th and 20th-century Western art and architecture periodicals. The Mary and Leigh Block Museum of Art, a major art museum in Chicago, contains more than 4,000 works in its permanent collection. It dedicates a third of its space to temporary and traveling exhibitions. The Holocaust Educational Foundation, which had previously endowed the Theodore Zev Weiss – Holocaust Educational Foundation Professorship in Holocaust Studies, became part of Northwestern in 2011.

Northwestern, along with 15 other universities, participates in digitizing its collections as part of the Google Book Search project.

Student life

Student body 

Northwestern enrolled 8,186 full-time undergraduates, 9,904 full-time graduates, and 3,856 part-time students in the 2019–2020 academic year. The freshman retention rate for that year was 98%. 86% of students graduated after four years and 92% graduated after five years. These numbers can largely be attributed to the university's various specialized degree programs, such as those that allow students to earn master's degrees with a one or two-year extension of their undergraduate program.

The undergraduate population is drawn from all 50 states and over 75 foreign countries. 20% of students in the Class of 2024 were Pell Grant recipients and 12.56% were first-generation college students. Northwestern also enrolls the 9th-most National Merit Scholars of any university in the nation.

In Fall 2014, 40.6% of undergraduate students were enrolled in the Weinberg College of Arts and Sciences, 21.3% in the McCormick School of Engineering and Applied Science, 14.3% in the School of Communication, 11.7% in the Medill School of Journalism, 5.7% in the Bienen School of Music, and 6.4% in the School of Education and Social Policy. The five most commonly awarded undergraduate degrees are economics, journalism, communication studies, psychology, and political science. The Kellogg School of Management's MBA, the School of Law's JD, and the Feinberg School of Medicine's MD are the three largest professional degree programs by enrollment. With 2,446 students enrolled in science, engineering, and health fields, the largest graduate programs by enrollment include chemistry, integrated biology, material sciences, electrical and computer engineering, neuroscience, and economics.

Undergraduate housing

Northwestern offers both traditional residence halls and residential colleges for students who share a particular intellectual interest. The residential colleges include Ayers College of Commerce and Industry, Chapin Hall (Humanities), East Fairchild (Communications), Hobart House (women's), Jones Residential College (Fine and Performing Arts), the Public Affairs Residential College, the Residential College of Cultural and Community Studies, Shepard Residential College (multi-thematic), Slivka Residential College for Science and Engineering, West Fairchild (International Studies), and Willard Residential College (multi-thematic). Residence halls include Allison Hall, Bobb-McCulloch, Elder Hall, Foster-Walker Complex (commonly referred to as Plex), Rogers House, and Shapiro Hall (formerly known as 560 Lincoln) among others.

An estimated 20% of undergraduates are affiliated with a fraternity or sorority. Northwestern recognizes 21 fraternities and 18 sororities.

Athletics 
Northwestern is a charter member of the Big Ten Conference. It is the conference's only private university and possesses the smallest undergraduate enrollment (the next-smallest member, the University of Iowa, is roughly three times as large, with almost 22,000 undergraduates).

Northwestern fields 19 intercollegiate athletic teams (8 men's and 11 women's) in addition to numerous club sports. 12 of Northwestern's varsity programs have had NCAA or bowl postseason appearances. Northwestern is one of five private AAU members to compete in NCAA Power Five conferences (the other four are Duke, Stanford, USC, and Vanderbilt) and maintains a 98% NCAA Graduation Success Rate, the highest among Football Bowl Subdivision schools.

In 2018, the school opened the Walter Athletics Center, a $270 million state-of-the-art lakefront facility for its athletics teams.

Nickname and mascot 
Before 1924, Northwestern teams were known as "The Purple" and unofficially as "The Fighting Methodists." The name Wildcats was bestowed upon the university in 1924 by Wallace Abbey, a writer for the Chicago Daily Tribune, who wrote that even in a loss to the University of Chicago, "Football players had not come down from Evanston; wildcats would be a name better suited to [Coach Glenn] Thistletwaite's boys." The name was so popular that university board members made "Wildcats" the official nickname just months later. In 1972, the student body voted to change the official nickname to "Purple Haze," but the new name never stuck.

The mascot of Northwestern Athletics is Willie the Wildcat. Prior to Willie, the team mascot had been a live, caged bear cub from the Lincoln Park Zoo named Furpaw, who was brought to the playing field on game days to greet the fans. After a losing season, the team decided that Furpaw was to blame for its misfortune and decided to select a new mascot. Willie the Wildcat made his debut in 1933, first as a logo and then in three dimensions in 1947, when members of the Alpha Delta fraternity dressed as wildcats during a Homecoming Parade.

Lacrosse 
The women's lacrosse team holds several scoring records and was undefeated in 2005 and 2009, winning five consecutive NCAA national championships during those years. It also won NCAA championships in 2011 and 2012, giving them a total of 7 NCAA championships in 8 years.

Football 
Northwestern's football team has made 73 appearances in the top 10 of the AP poll since 1936 (including 5 at #1) and has won eight Big Ten conference championships since 1903. At one time, Northwestern had the longest losing streak in Division I-A, losing 34 consecutive games between 1979 and 1982. They did not appear in a bowl game after 1949 until the 1996 Rose Bowl. The team did not win a bowl since the 1949 Rose Bowl until the 2013 Gator Bowl. Following the sudden death of football coach Randy Walker in 2006, 31-year-old former All-American Northwestern linebacker Pat Fitzgerald assumed the position, becoming the youngest Division I FBS coach at the time.

Basketball 
The Helms Athletic Foundation named the men's basketball team the 1931 National Champion. In 2017, the men's basketball team earned an NCAA berth for the first time in the program's history. They won their first-round matchup against Vanderbilt University but lost to number-one seed Gonzaga in the second round.

In 1998, two former Northwestern basketball players were charged and convicted for sports bribery, having been paid to shave points in games against three other Big Ten schools during the 1995 season. The football team became embroiled in a different betting scandal later that year when federal prosecutors indicted four former players for perjury related to betting on their own games. In August 2001, Rashidi Wheeler, a senior safety, collapsed and died during practice from an asthma attack. An autopsy revealed that he had ephedrine, a stimulant banned by the NCAA, in his system, which prompted Northwestern to investigate the prevalence of stimulants and other banned substances across all of its athletic programs. In 2006, the Northwestern women's soccer team was suspended and coach Jenny Haigh resigned following the release of images of alleged hazing.

Traditions 

 Northwestern's official motto, "Quaecumque sunt vera," was adopted by the university in 1890. The Latin phrase translates to "Whatsoever things are true" and comes from the Epistle of Paul to the Philippians, in which St. Paul admonishes the Christians in the Greek city of Philippi. In addition to this motto, the university crest features a Greek phrase taken from the Gospel of John inscribed on the pages of an open book, ήρης χάριτος και αληθείας or "the word full of grace and truth". 
 "Alma Mater" is the Northwestern Hymn. The original Latin version of the hymn was written in 1907 by Peter Christian Lutkin, the first dean of the School of Music from 1883 to 1931. In 1953, then Director-of-Bands John Paynter recruited an undergraduate music student, Thomas Tyra ('54), to write an English version of the song, which today is performed by the Marching Band during halftime at Wildcat football games and by the orchestra during ceremonies and other special occasions.
 Purple became Northwestern's official color in 1892, replacing black and gold after a university committee concluded that too many other universities had used these colors. Today, Northwestern's official color is purple, although white is something of an official color as well, being mentioned in both the university's earliest song, Alma Mater (1907) ("Hail to purple, hail to white") and in many university guidelines.
 The Rock, a 6-foot high quartzite boulder donated by the Class of 1902, originally served as a water fountain. It was painted over by students in the 1940s as a prank and has since become a popular vehicle of self-expression on campus. By tradition, students must guard it for twenty-four hours before painting it.
 Dillo Day is the largest student-run music festival in the nation, hosted annually on the Lakefill. The festival is celebrating its 50th anniversary in 2022.
 Primal Scream is held every quarter at 9 p.m. on the Sunday before finals week. Students lean out of windows or gather in courtyards and scream to help relieve stress. 
 In the past, students would throw marshmallows during football games, but this tradition has since been discontinued.

Philanthropy 
One of Northwestern's most notable student charity events is Dance Marathon, the most established and largest student-run philanthropy in the nation. The annual 30-hour event is among the most widely attended events on campus. It has raised over $1 million for charity every year since 2011 and has donated a total of $13 million to children's charities since its conception.

The Northwestern Community Development Corps (NCDC) is a student-run organization that connects hundreds of student volunteers to community development projects in Evanston and Chicago throughout the year. The group also holds a number of annual community events, including Project Pumpkin, a Halloween celebration that provides over 800 local children with carnival events and a safe venue to trick-or-treat each year.

Many Northwestern students participate in the Freshman Urban Program, an initiative for students interested in community service to work on addressing social issues facing the city of Chicago, and the university's Global Engagement Studies Institute (GESI) programs, including group service-learning expeditions in Asia, Africa, or Latin America in conjunction with the Foundation for Sustainable Development.

Several international nongovernmental organizations were established at Northwestern, including the World Health Imaging, Informatics and Telemedicine Alliance, a spin-off from an engineering student's honors thesis.

Performing arts 
Northwestern is a prolific producer of successful entertainers and a nationally reputed hub for collegiate performing arts. The Student Theatre Coalition, or StuCo, organizes nine student theater companies, multiple performance groups, and over sixty independent productions each year. The two most notable productions are The Waa-Mu Show, an original musical written and produced entirely by students, and the Dolphin show. Children's theater is represented on campus by Griffin's Tale and Purple Crayon Players.

Chicago's renowned Lookingglass Theatre Company, which began life in the Great Room of Jones Residential College, was founded in 1988 by several university alumni, including David Schwimmer. It received the Regional Tony Award in 2011 and has won over 45 Joseph Jefferson Awards in its 30 Seasons.

The undergraduate students maintain twelve a cappella groups, including THUNK a cappella, the Northwestern Undertones, Freshman Fifteen A Cappella, ShireiNU A Cappella, and Purple Haze.

Media

Print 

 Established in 1881, The Daily Northwestern is the university's main student newspaper and is published on weekdays during the academic year. It is directed entirely by undergraduate students and owned by the Students Publishing Company. Although it serves the Northwestern community, the Daily has no business ties to the university and is supported wholly by advertisers. 
 North by Northwestern is an online undergraduate magazine established in September 2006 by students at the Medill School of Journalism. Published on weekdays, it consists of updates on news stories and special events throughout the year. It also publishes a quarterly print magazine.
 Syllabus is the university's undergraduate yearbook. It is distributed in late May and features a culmination of the year's events at Northwestern. First published in 1885, the yearbook is published by Students Publishing Company and edited by Northwestern students.
 Northwestern Flipside is an undergraduate satirical magazine. Founded in 2009, it publishes a weekly issue both in print and online.
 Helicon is the university's undergraduate literary magazine. Established in 1979, it is published twice a year: a web issue is released in the winter and a print issue with a web complement is released in the spring.
 The Protest is Northwestern's quarterly social justice magazine.
 The Northwestern division of Student Multicultural Affairs supports a number of publications for particular cultural groups including Ahora, a magazine about Hispanic and Latino/a culture and campus life; Al Bayan,  published by the Northwestern Muslim-cultural Student Association; BlackBoard Magazine, a magazine centered around African-American student life; and NUAsian, a magazine and blog on Asian and Asian-American culture and issues.
 The Northwestern University Law Review is a scholarly legal publication and student organization at Northwestern University School of Law. Its primary purpose is to publish a journal of broad legal scholarship. The Law Review publishes six issues each year. Student editors make the editorial and organizational decisions and select articles submitted by professors, judges, and practitioners, as well as student pieces. The Law Review also publishes scholarly pieces weekly on the Colloquy.
 The Northwestern Journal of Technology and Intellectual Property is a law review published by an independent student organization at Northwestern University School of Law. 
 The Northwestern Interdisciplinary Law Review is a scholarly legal publication published annually by an editorial board of Northwestern undergraduates. Its mission is to publish interdisciplinary legal research, drawing from fields such as history, literature, economics, philosophy, and art. Founded in 2008, the journal features articles by professors, law students, practitioners, and undergraduates. It is funded by the Buffett Center for International and Comparative Studies and the Office of the Provost.

Web-based 

 Established in January 2011, Sherman Ave is a satirical website that often publishes content on Northwestern student life. Most of its staff writers are current Northwestern undergraduates writing under various pseudonyms. The website is popular among students for its interviews of prominent campus figures, "Freshman Guide", and live-tweeting coverage of football games. In Fall 2012, the website promoted a satiric campaign to end the Vanderbilt University football team's custom of clubbing baby seals.
 Politics & Policy is dedicated to the analysis of current events and public policy. Established in 2010 by students at the Weinberg College of Arts and Sciences, School of Communication, and Medill School of Journalism, the publication reaches students on more than 250 college campuses around the world. Run entirely by undergraduates, it is published several times a week and features material ranging from short summaries of events to extended research pieces. The publication is financed in part by the Buffett Center.
 Northwestern Business Review is a campus source for business news. Founded in 2005, it has an online presence as well as a quarterly print schedule.
 TriQuarterly Online (formerly TriQuarterly) is a literary magazine published twice a year featuring poetry, fiction, nonfiction, drama, literary essays, reviews, blog posts, and art.
 The Queer Reader is Northwestern's first radical feminist and LGBTQ+ publication.

Radio, film, and television 

 WNUR (89.3 FM) is a 7,200-watt radio station that broadcasts to the city of Chicago and its northern suburbs. WNUR's programming consists of music (jazz, classical, and rock), literature, politics, current events, varsity sports (football, men's and women's basketball, baseball, softball, and women's lacrosse), and breaking news on weekdays.
 Studio 22 is a student-run production company that produces roughly ten films each year. The organization financed the first film Zach Braff directed, and many of its films have featured students who would later go into professional acting, including Zach Gilford of Friday Night Lights.
 Applause for a Cause is currently the only student-run production company in the nation to create feature-length films for charity. It was founded in 2010 and has raised over $5,000 to date for various local and national organizations across the United States.
 Northwestern News Network is a student television news and sports network, serving the Northwestern and Evanston communities. Its studios and newsroom are located on the fourth floor of the McCormick Tribune Center on Northwestern's Evanston campus. NNN is funded by the Medill School of Journalism.

Speech and debate 
The Northwestern Debate Society has won fifteen National Debate Tournaments, the highest number of any university. Notable alumni of the society include Erwin Chemerinsky, legal scholar and Dean of UC Berkeley School of Law, and Elliot Mincberg of People For the American Way.

Northwestern's Mock Trial team had two teams qualify for the 2018 National Championship Tournament hosted by the American Mock Trial Association, making Northwestern one of seven schools in the nation to be represented by multiple teams at the competition. One of the two teams finished 9th in their division and is ranked 20th in the country out of roughly 750 teams for the 2018–2019 season.

People

Alumni 

Northwestern alumni have included numerous prominent figures in journalism, government, literature, business, science, performing arts, education, and medicine. Among U.S. universities, Northwestern ranks eighth in the number of billionaires produced.

Some of Northwestern's most notable alumni include U.S. Senator and presidential candidate George McGovern, Nobel Prize-winning economist George J. Stigler, Nobel Prize-winning novelist Saul Bellow, Pulitzer Prize-winning composer and diarist Ned Rorem, decorated composer Howard Hanson, Deputy Prime Minister of Turkey Ali Babacan, historian and novelist Wilma Dykeman, sociologist and adviser of CEPAL Fernando Filgueira, and the founder of the presidential prayer breakfast Abraham Vereide.

U.S. Supreme Court Associate Justice John Paul Stevens, Supreme Court Justice and Ambassador to the United Nations Arthur Joseph Goldberg, Chicago Mayor Harold L. Washington, Governor of Illinois and Democratic presidential candidate Adlai Stevenson, and former lawyer, Cincinnati mayor, news anchor, and current tabloid talk host Jerry Springer are among the graduates of the Northwestern School of Law.

Northwestern alumnus David J. Skorton serves has been president and chief executive officer of the Association of American Medical Colleges since July 15, 2019

Northwestern's School of Communication is well known for producing successful actors, actresses, playwrights, and film and television writers and directors.

Alumni who have made their mark on film and television include Ann-Margret, Warren Beatty, Jodie Markell, Paul Lynde, David Schwimmer, Anne Dudek, Zach Braff, Zooey Deschanel, Marg Helgenberger, Julia Louis-Dreyfus, Meghan Markle (later known as the Duchess of Sussex), Jerry Orbach, Jennifer Jones, Megan Mullally, John Cameron Mitchell, Dermot Mulroney, Charlton Heston, Richard Kind, Ana Gasteyer, Brad Hall, Shelley Long, William Daniels, Cloris Leachman, Bonnie Bartlett, Paula Prentiss, Richard Benjamin, Laura Innes, Charles Busch, Stephanie March, Tony Roberts, Jeri Ryan, Kimberly Williams-Paisley, McLean Stevenson, Tony Randall, Charlotte Rae, Patricia Neal, Tom Virtue, Nancy Dussault, Robert Reed, Mara Brock Akil, Greg Berlanti, Bill Nuss, Dan Shor, Seth Meyers, Peter Spears, Frank DeCaro, Zach Gilford, Nicole Sullivan, Stephen Colbert, Billy Eichner, Sandra Seacat and Garry Marshall. Directors who were graduated from Northwestern include Gerald Freedman, Stuart Hagmann, Marshall W. Mason, Allison Burnett, Michael Greif, and Mary Zimmerman.

Alumni such as Sheldon Harnick, Stephanie D'Abruzzo, Heather Headley, Kristen Schaal, Lily Rabe, and Walter Kerr have distinguished themselves on Broadway, as has designer Bob Mackie. Amsterdam-based comedy theater Boom Chicago was founded by Northwestern alumni, and the school has become a training ground for future The Second City, I.O., ComedySportz, Mad TV and Saturday Night Live talent. Tam Spiva wrote scripts for The Brady Bunch and Gentle Ben. In New York, Los Angeles, and Chicago, the number of Northwestern alumni involved in theater, film, and television is so large that the alumni have been dubbed the "Northwestern mafia."

The Medill School of Journalism has produced notable journalists and political activists including 42 Pulitzer Prize laureates. National correspondents, reporters and columnists such as The New York Times Elisabeth Bumiller, David Barstow, Dean Murphy, and Vincent Laforet, USA Today's Gary Levin, Susan Page and Christine Brennan, NBC correspondent Kelly O'Donnell, CBS correspondent Richard Threlkeld, CNN correspondent Nicole Lapin, former CNN and current Al Jazeera America anchor Joie Chen, sports broadcasting legend Brent Musburger, and ESPN personalities Rachel Nichols, Michael Wilbon, Mike Greenberg, Steve Weissman, J. A. Adande, and Kevin Blackistone. The bestselling author of the A Song of Ice and Fire series, George R. R. Martin, earned a B.S. and M.S. from Medill. Elisabeth Leamy is the recipient of 13 Emmy awards and four Edward R. Murrow Awards.

The Feinberg School of Medicine (previously the Northwestern University Medical School) has produced a number of notable graduates, including Mary Harris Thompson, Class of 1870, ad eundem, first female surgeon in Chicago, first female surgeon at Cook County Hospital, and founder of the Mary Thomson Hospital; Roswell Park, Class of 1876, prominent surgeon for whom Roswell Park Comprehensive Cancer Center in Buffalo, New York, is named; Daniel Hale Williams, Class of 1883, performed the first successful American open heart surgery; only black charter member of the American College of Surgeons, Charles Horace Mayo, Class of 1888, co-founder of Mayo Clinic; Carlos Montezuma, Class of 1889, one of the first Native Americans to receive a Doctor of Medicine degree from any school, and founder of the Society of American Indians; Howard T. Ricketts, Class of 1897, who discovered bacteria of the genus Rickettsia, and identified the cause and methods of transmission of rocky mountain spotted fever; Allen B. Kanavel, Class of 1899, founder, regent, and president of the American College of Surgeons, internationally recognized as the founder of modern hand and peripheral nerve surgery; Robert F. Furchgott, Class of 1940, recipient of a Lasker Award in 1996 and the 1998 Nobel Prize in Physiology or Medicine for his co-discovery of nitric oxide; Thomas E. Starzl, Class of 1952, who performed the first successful liver transplant in 1967 and received the National Medal of Science in 2004 and a Lasker Award in 2012; Joseph P. Kerwin, first physician in space, flew on the Skylab 2 mission and later served as director of Space and Life Sciences at NASA; C. Richard Schlegel, Class of 1972, developed the dominant patent for a vaccine against human papillomavirus (administered as Gardasil) to prevent cervical cancer; David J. Skorton, Class of 1974, cardiologist who became president of Cornell University in 2006; and Andrew E. Senyei, Class of 1979, inventor, venture capitalist, and entrepreneur, founder of biotech and genetics companies, and a university trustee.

Northwestern alumni have founded notable companies and organizations such as the Mayo Clinic, The Blackstone Group, Kirkland & Ellis, U.S. Steel, Guggenheim Partners, Accenture, Aon Corporation, AQR Capital, Booz Allen Hamilton, and Melvin Capital.

Northwestern alumni involved in music include Steve Albini, Thomas Tyra, Andrew Bird, Robert Davine, Joshua Radin, Frederick Swann, Augusta Read Thomas, Gil Trythall, members of Arcade Fire, The Lawrence Arms, Pharrell Williams, Chavez, Dawen, A Liang (Linton St) and OK Go.

Northwestern alumni involved in athletics include Chicago Bulls and Chicago White Sox owner Jerry Reinsdorf, sprinter Betty Robinson, Rick Sund (NBA), Billy McKinney (NBA), Mark Loretta (MLB), Joe Girardi (MLB), Luis Castillo (NFL), Ernie Adams (NFL), Paddy Driscoll (NFL), Otto Graham (NFL), Anthony Walker Jr. (NFL), Mike Adamle (NFL), Mike Kafka (NFL), Trevor Siemian (NFL), Greg Newsome II (NFL), Luke Johnsos (NFL), six-time Olympic medalist Matt Grevers, Irv Cross (NFL) and PGA Tour star Luke Donald.

Faculty

The university employs 3,781 faculty members across its eleven schools, including 18 members of the National Academy of Sciences, 65 members of the American Academy of Arts and Sciences, 19 members of the National Academy of Engineering, and 6 members of the Institute of Medicine. Notable faculty include 2010 Nobel Prize–winning economist Dale T. Mortensen; nano-scientists Chad Mirkin and Samuel I. Stupp; Benjamin Franklin Medal in Electrical Engineering winner Manijeh Razeghi; Tony Award-winning director Mary Zimmerman; management expert Philip Kotler; King Faisal International Prize in Science recipient and Nobel laureate Sir Fraser Stoddart; Steppenwolf Theatre director Anna Shapiro; sexual psychologist J. Michael Bailey; Federalist Society co-founder Steven Calabresi; former Weatherman Bernardine Rae Dohrn; ethnographer Gary Alan Fine; Pulitzer Prize–winning historian Garry Wills; American Academy of Arts and Sciences fellow Monica Olvera de la Cruz and MacArthur Fellowship recipients Stuart Dybek, Jennifer Richeson, Amy Rosenzweig, John A. Rogers, Mark Hersam, William Dichtel, and Dylan Penningroth. The faculty also includes Holocaust denier Arthur Butz and Richard Bruce Silverman, inventor of Lyrica (Pregabalin). Notable former faculty include political advisor David Axelrod, artists William Conger, Judy Ledgerwood, Ed Paschke, and James Valerio, writer Charles Newman, Nobel Prize–winning chemist John Pople, and military sociologist and "don't ask, don't tell" author Charles Moskos.

Notes

References

Citations

Sources
 Work cited

Further reading

External links

 
 Official athletics website
 
 
 "Chicago Dance History Project / Interviews with Dancers connected to Northwestern University"

 
Educational institutions established in 1851
Education in Evanston, Illinois
Universities and colleges in Chicago
Tourist attractions in Evanston, Illinois
1851 establishments in Illinois
Universities and colleges affiliated with the Methodist Episcopal Church
Private universities and colleges in Illinois
Universities and colleges accredited by the Higher Learning Commission